General elections were  held in Lesotho on 26 May 2012. The incumbent Prime Minister Pakalitha Mosisili's newly formed Democratic Congress won a majority of single-member seats. He also won his seat by the second-largest margin of victory. However, they only had a plurality in the overall tally and coalition talks are taking place.

Background
As a result of the impact of the Arab Spring in 2011, protests occurred against the government in regard to unemployment, poverty and low salaries. The protests eventually had the support of taxi drivers, unions, students and opposition political parties. They also demanded to meet Prime Minister Pakalitha Mosisili, who had at times refused to do so.

Following a dispute over the allocation of the proportional seats in the 2007 elections, the electoral system was amended, with the National Assembly Elections Order 1992 repealed and replaced by the National Assembly Elections Act 2011. The previous system of casting separate votes for a constituency candidate and a national party list was replaced by voters casting a single vote for a party, which was counted for both the constituency candidate and the national party list.

Parties and campaign
Before the election, the ruling Lesotho Congress for Democracy suffered a split because of Prime Minister Pakalitha Mosisili's refusal to cede power. He then founded a new party called the Ntsu Democratic Congress, in reference to the founder of the LCD Ntsu Mokhehle. The LCD's secretary-general Mothetjoa Metsing then moved to lead the LCD.

Tom Thabane leads another faction that broke away in 2006, the All Basotho Convention, which is expected to benefit from the infighting of the other two parties. Voters' primary demands were reportedly job creation and an improvement in "basic services." The LCD's Metsing said that he would not take part in a national unity government. In like measure ABC ruled out working with LCD.

Opinion polls
Most polls predicted a plurality for the Democratic Congress. One tribal chief, Mohato Bereng, said that he would vote for change in supporting the Lesotho Congress for Democracy. Incumbent Prime Minister Pakalitha Mosisili had an approval of rating of 39% a month before the election. Two days before the election, Mosisili said that DC would get a simple majority.

Conduct
Former Malawian President Bakili Muluzi, who headed the Commonwealth of Nations' electoral observer team, said that despite a history of coup d'etats he was assured by the army and police that there would be no interference. There were also electoral monitoring teams from the African Union and the Southern African Development Community.

Results
Voting centres were opened from 7:00 at 17:00. Vote counting started at the vote centres in Maseru before they closed. The official results were expected the day after the vote due to the remoteness of some communities. Maliako Ralejoe of the Independent Electoral Commission said at the end of the day that: "Currently most of the urban areas have been counted, which is a good indicator. We have had challenges with the rural areas as some areas are still counting, but Maseru is complete. We estimate that [on 29 May] we will be able to announce the final verdict." On 27 May, the IEC suspended the electoral count because of "serious logistical problems." This caused tension in Maseru and opposition parties led by ABC pressured the IEC to release the result.

Voter turnout was 564,451 or 50.04%.

List of elected MPs

* Largest margin of victory by just over 92.9% of votes.
**Won by 33 votes over ABC's Ramoshebi Maboee Moletsane (39 ballots were "rejected").
***Won by 39 votes over DC's Mokhele Stephen Moletsane (19 ballots were "rejected").
****Won by 94 voted over ABC's Tsoinyana Samuel Rapapa (161 ballots were "rejected")
*****Smallest margin of victory by 14 votes over LCD's Doreen Chaoana-Mapetsa (47 ballots were "rejected")
#District capital
##District and national capital

Reactions
Ramahoana Matlosa, who lost his bid to become an MP from Maseru District, sad that the DC failed to attract the youth vote. "Of course we knew the ABC would be strong in urban areas. But if you add our numbers to the LCDs, we would have beaten them. It's just that the ABC had an advantage because their number stayed the same and we split." The AU and SADC monitoring teams said of the election that "we are delighted that the voting and counting took place in an atmosphere of peace and tranquility."

Electoral observers said the election was largely free and fair. The Commonwealth of Nations' Bakili Muluzi said that "we chose democracy in Africa. And we should allow democracy to prevail.

Government formation
An unnamed senior party member of DC said that they had begun coalition talks with ABC, but would also look to open talks with LCD if those failed. He also said that the party could try to lure in individual MPs from the other parties if all options failed, while adding that "we are confident that we will lead the new government. We are also not political buffoons not to know that we have to start serious engagements with any coalition partners immediately." DC upped their attempts to build a coalition with LCD upon realising they would not get a majority after proportional seats were allocated. Confidantes to ABC's Thabane said that he was confident of winning the seats necessary to head a coalition government with the other parties, who could possibly get a share of the proportionally allocated seats. An unnamed party member said that "we are in serious discussions with the LCD but most will depend on the final tally of the seats. The LCD is our first preference for any coalition as we have all been in the opposition," but that this was subject to the proportional seats being allocated "properly."

On 30 May, ABC's Thabane told the BBC that he had formed a coalition to give him a majority in parliament. His coalition included the LCD, Basotho National Party, Popular Front for Democracy and the Marematlou Freedom Party. He also said that the government's priorities would be "poverty, lack of jobs, lack of school opportunities, absence of schools at the right places, lack of proper infrastructure, particularly health services. We have gone way below what we were a few years ago, and that's inexplicable. We put power in the hands of the wrong people and we are taking it away from them."

Mosisili resigned on 31 May and would be the Leader of the Opposition. Following this Lincoln Ralechate Mokose, the secretary general of DC, said the party would seek coalition partners and that "we will either succeed or fail. [If the party fails] our stand is to concede and work in parliament as opposition." ABC's secretary-general, Thabiso Litšiba, said it could be a week before the new parliament meets and officially chooses the new Prime Minister.

Analysis
Prior to the vote, Hoolo 'Nyane, the director of the Transformation Resource Centre, said that the lack of a governing coalition "would be a very disturbing scenario. [A repeat of the 1998 stand-off and violence which led to the death of 58 locals and eight South African soldiers, as well as large damages in Maseru were] not completely unlikely." He added that "the entire young and urban vote is in revolt against Mosisili."

The coordinator of development for Peace Education, which monitored the election, Sofonea Shale, said that "maybe the politics of arrogance have come to an end, and we'd be turning a new page based on politics of negotiation. A coalition government is highly likely, which is why I'm saying it's time for a new era. A coalition needs parties to negotiate."

On 29 May, the Lesotho Times reported that the LCD were likely to be "heavily compensated" by the proportionally allotted seats due to finishing second in many constituencies. Most DC votes were in rural areas, while politicians and observers said that an ABC-LCD coalition was likely.

References

External links
 Statement of the Independent Electoral Commission on the announcement of the result - by the Chairperson Molula-Setulo.
 Party list candidates for all parties

Elections in Lesotho
Lesotho
General
Lesotho